Galatasaray Museum (officially Galatasaray University Culture&Art Center) is a cultural center in Istanbul, Turkey, founded in 1868 to inform the society of the traditions and history of Galatasaray. The museum is open to the public every day except Mondays.

The Building
The museum initially opened at Kalamış Bay. Later in 1919, it was moved to Galatasaray High School. The museum building, formerly known as Galatasaray Post Office, was restored and remodelled to suit a museum. Galatasaray Museum was renovated and reopened in 2009 with a very successful and contemporary exhibition concept. Galatasaray opened its new museum in 2018. Most trophies and plaques have been moved to the new museum located in the Nef Stadium. The museum in Beyoğlu is still in use. However, most of the trophies are on display in the newly opened stadium museum.

Admission and location
Museum hours
Tuesday - Sunday: 10.00 - 19.00
Closed on Mondays.

Admission
Free admission for all.

Address
İstiklal Caddesi No: 90
Beyoğlu - İstanbul, Turkey

First Floor - Lycee de Galatasaray & Galatasaray University Section

First floor of this museum is dedicated to Lycee de Galatasaray and Galatasaray University.

Second Floor - Galatasaray Sports Club Section

Second floor of this museum is dedicated to Galatasaray Sports Club

Museums in Istanbul
Galatasaray S.K.
Beyoğlu
Association football museums and halls of fame
Sports museums in Turkey
1868 establishments in the Ottoman Empire
Museums established in 1868